Strada statale 44 delle Dolomiti (SS 48), also known as strada regionale 48 delle Dolomiti (SR 48) is a motorway located in the Italian regions of Trentino-Alto Adige/Südtirol and Veneto. It is a mountainous road that runs through the Dolomite area from South Tyrol, through Trentino to Cadore (province of Belluno), crossing very suggestive mountain scenery.

References 

48
Transport in South Tyrol
Transport in Trentino
Transport in Veneto